is a town located in Higashisonogi District, Nagasaki Prefecture, Japan. It is known, along with neighboring Arita, Saga Prefecture for its china manufacturing.

As of 2 September 2021, the town has an estimated population of 14,511. The total area is 56.00 km2.

Geography 
Hasami is located within the central part of Nagasaki prefecture, which is about 20 kilometers from central Sasebo. It is the only landlocked town in the prefecture.

Surrounding municipalities 

 Nagasaki Prefecture
 Sasebo
 Kawatana
 Saga Prefecture
 Takeo
 Ureshino
 Arita

Culture 
Hasami is best known for Hasami ware, a type of Japanese porcelain dating back 400 years. The techniques were brought to the Hasami area by Korean ceramicist Yi Sam-pyeong, also the creator of Arita ware from nearby Arita. Hasami ware is distinct from Arita ware, but is often confused as pieces were shipped out of Arita or the neighboring port of Imari. Seventeen kilns and pottery houses are active in the village, with an additional five kilns around the neighboring Mt. Nakao. The town hosts both the Hasami Spring Festival, and the Autumn Ceramics Festival in October.

Education 
Hasami has one high school, called the Nagasaki Prefectural Hasami High School (長崎県立波佐見高等学校). Furthermore, there are three elementary schools and one junior high school in Hasami.

Transportation 
Hasami is not served by any railways, with the closest stations being Arita Station in Arita and Kawatana Station in Kawatana.

Highway 

 Nishi-Kyushu Expressway

Sister cities 
Hasami has one sister city and one friendship city relationship:

  Mauá, Brazil (since 2 April 1988)

Friendship cities 

 Gangjin County, South Korea (since 20 October 2010)

References

External links

 Hasami official website 

Towns in Nagasaki Prefecture